The 2008 Western Kentucky Hilltoppers football team represented Western Kentucky University (WKU) during the 2008 NCAA Division I FBS football season. The team's head coach was David Elson. WKU competed as an NCAA Division I FBS independent team in 2008 before their move to the Sun Belt Conference in 2009. The Hilltoppers played their home games at Houchens Industries–L. T. Smith Stadium in Bowling Green, Kentucky.

Schedule

Coaching staff

Game summaries

Indiana

Eastern Kentucky

Alabama

Murray State

Kentucky

Virginia Tech

Ball St

Florida Atlantic

North Texas

Troy

Middle Tennessee

Florida International

References

Western Kentucky
Western Kentucky Hilltoppers football seasons
Western Kentucky Hilltoppers football